James Dalessandro (born 1948) is an American writer and filmmaker. He is best known for his historical-fiction novel 1906 based on events surrounding the great San Francisco earthquake and fire of 1906.

A film adaptation of 1906, based on both the novel and Dalessandro's screenplay, has been in development at Warner Bros. and Pixar Animation Studios, in association with Walt Disney Pictures.  Screenwriter and director Brad Bird has been developing a project based on the novel.

Early life and education
James Dalessandro was born in Cleveland, Ohio on September 3, 1948, and attended Valley Forge High School.  He is of predominantly Italian descent, holds both U.S. and Italian/EU Citizenships, and is proficient in both written and spoken Italian.  He studied journalism at Ohio University, in Athens, Ohio, screenwriting and film making at UCLA.

Career 
For many years, Dalessandro worked as a writer in the trailer/marketing department at Columbia Pictures, where he worked on dozens of films.

From 1973 to 1977, he was co-founder of The Santa Cruz Poetry Festival, with Lawrence Ferlinghetti, and served as its director for four years. As the nation's largest annual literary festival at the time, it brought Charles Bukowski, William S. Burroughs, Allen Ginsberg, Ken Kesey, Michael McClure, Gary Snyder, and musicians like Anthony Braxton and Charles Lloyd to the seaside town of Santa Cruz, CA, which set attendance records (over 2,000 people per night) at the Civic Auditorium. It ushered in what Ferlinghetti called "A new birth of American Poetry. The credit belongs to James Dalessandro."

Dalessandro was also the writer of The House of Blues Radio Hour, which was hosted by Dan Aykroyd (as Elwood Blues) during the period in which it won the Platinum Award from the National Association of Broadcasters.  He was also the writer/creator of "Rock On" with The Doors' keyboardist Ray Manzarek. Both projects were produced for Ben Manilla Productions of San Francisco, CA.

He has been a member of the Writers Guild of America (WGA) since 1985 and has sold or been hired on more than 30 feature film and television projects for Motown Films, Century Park Pictures, Mark Wolper Productions, Organic Media, Televisa USA, Gross/Jacobson Productions, Roger Birnbaum, Barry Levinson, Starlings Entertainment, Warner Brothers Films, Warner Brothers and many others.

Dalessandro has published four books: Canary In A Coal Mine (poetry), Bohemian Heart, a work of detective fiction published in 1993, Citizen Jane (true crime), and 1906 (historical fiction).

In 1997, his 38-page outline and six finished chapters for a new novel, "1906", an epic re-telling of the great San Francisco Earthquake and fire, became the subject of an intense Hollywood bidding war.  After several days of negotiations between major film companies and directors, including Universal Studios and Steven Spielberg, the rights went to Warner Brothers Films and their newly signed director Barry Levinson.  Dalessandro did several adaptations of the book outline into a film outline and wrote three drafts of the screenplay.  After Levinson left the projects, the screenplay went through numerous drafts with other screenwriters who took great liberties with the real story.  In 2007, the project was handed to Pixar and writer/director Brad Bird, where it continued to drift away from Dalessandro's original story, which had been widely recognized as close to real events.  In December 2018 and following the runaway success of Incredibles 2, director Brad Bird told Deadline.com podcast that he had recommitted to the project and embraced the elements of the story in Dalessandro's novel.

In 2016, the Kindle/Digital edition of 1906: A Novel reached #1 in Historical Fiction on Amazon.com, Apple Books, and virtually every internet book list, including USA Today, and stayed on Amazon's Top 100 (Historical Fiction) for several weeks. In the same year his true crime "Citizen Jane" reached #1 in every digital Bestseller list, and remained in Amazon's Top 100 for two months.

Dalessandro's documentary on the 1906 Earthquake "The Damnedest, Finest Ruins" won numerous film festival awards and was eventually broadcast on San Francisco's KQED/PBS Station, and currently runs on its Youtube.com channel "Truly California."   In January 2005, San Francisco's Board of Supervisor's voted unanimously on Dalessandro's resolution to set aside the 1906 death count of 478, which had stood since a month after the disaster and recognized the figure of "3,000 plus" that was the result of four decades of research by San Francisco Historian Emeritus Gladys Hansen.   The resolution made worldwide news.   Dalessandro maintains, as of 2019, that the real death count from the disaster is more likely between 6,000 and 10,000.

In September 2009, Hallmark Channel broadcast the movie Citizen Jane, the story of Jane Alexander, a Marin County, California woman who had spent 13 years tracking down and helping to convict the man who murdered her 88-year-old aunt. Dalessandro wrote the teleplay and served as one of the movie's producers. He also wrote the pilot for a series based on Citizen Jane, which is under active development with producer Larry Jacobson and Entertainment One. He is the award-winning writer, director and producer of the documentary film, The Damnedest, Finest Ruins, narrated by actor Peter Coyote, which took a definitive look at the great San Francisco earthquake and fire. Robert Ericksson of the History Channel called the documentary "astonishing."

The January 2010 issue of Playboy ran his feature article Petrosino v. The Black Hand, the story of Joseph Petrosino, a New York shoeshine boy who was drafted into the NYPD to combat crime in Little Italy, launching his 26-year battle with the American Mafia.  As of 2014, he was the writer and Executive Producer of an FX Channel, 10-Hour limited series based on the life of Det. Joseph Petrosino with his writing/producing partner, Bobby Moresco, Oscar winner for Crash and Million Dollar Baby.  As of 2020, the Petrosino project is a full series in development with Levinson/Fontana Productions, with Dalessandro now partnered as Writer/Executive Producer with Tom Fontana (Oz; Homicide, Life on the Streets; City on a Hill) and director Barry Levinson (Bugsy, Good Morning Vietnam, Wag the Dog).

In 2016, he wrote the pilot and bible for a series entitled "Stan Lee's - The Chosen" and serves as its Executive Producer.  In the same year, he was hired by Los Angeles/Beijing Studios (LABS) as screenwriter and Executive Producer of a 6-Hour mini-series on the life of martial arts icon Bruce Lee.  As of late 2021 the Bruce Lee project is now back in active development with Organic Media.

Dalessandro has lectured at the Cinequest Film Festival and the Screenwriting Expo in Los Angeles, CA. He formerly taught "Screenwriting as a Pro" at Fort Mason Art Center and 17 years as an adjunct professor in Advanced Film and Advanced Television Writing at the Academy of Art University - both in San Francisco.

Dalessandro is currently Executive Producer and co-writer of Stan Lee's "RESTLESS" television series with David Greenwalt (Buffy the Vampire Slayer, Angel, Grimm).

Personal life 
James Dalessandro is married to the former Kathleen "Katie" Callies (since 1988) and has an adopted son, Jeremy Christopher Katevas.

References 

Living people
20th-century American novelists
American male screenwriters
Academy of Art University faculty
Writers from Cleveland
Ohio University alumni
UCLA Film School alumni
1948 births
American crime fiction writers
American non-fiction crime writers
American historical novelists
21st-century American novelists
20th-century American poets
21st-century American poets
American male novelists
American male poets
20th-century American male writers
21st-century American male writers
Novelists from Ohio
20th-century American non-fiction writers
21st-century American non-fiction writers
American male non-fiction writers
Screenwriters from California
Screenwriters from Ohio